Bylazora is a genus of moths in the family Geometridae described by Francis Walker in 1863.

Description
Palpi porrect (extending forward) and hairy. A large frontal tuft present. Hindlegs with a tuft of long hair from femoro-tibial joint. Wings with crenulate outer margin. Forewings short and broad. Costa arched at base. Male with a fovea. Vein 3 from near angle of cell and veins 7 to 9 stalked from near upper angle. Vein 10 and 11 stalked and anastomosing (fusing) with vein 12. Hindwings with vein 3 from near angle of cell.

Species
Bylazora infumata Felder & Rogenhofer, 1875
Bylazora licheniferata Walker, [1863]
Bylazora pilicostata Walker, 1862

References

Ennominae